The 1990 Sabah state election was held between Monday, 16 July and Tuesday, 17 July 1990. Parti Bersatu Sabah (PBS) was the incumbent ruling party in the state and part of the Barisan Nasional coalition, which PBS joined after the 1986 state election. 

In the election, PBS won with the same seat as the previous election, 34. United Sabah National Organization (USNO) winning the remaining 14 seats to become the main opposition, while other parties, including former state government party BERJAYA, did not win any seat.

Contesting parties
USNO was also a member of the BN but rival of PBS. Therefore, PBS and USNO candidates were made to contest under their own party tickets.

Among other parties contesting for the first time including AKAR formed by former PBS vice-president Mark Koding, PBS member Kalakau Untol, and USNO ex-member Pandikar Amin Mulia; Parti Rakyat Sabah formed by ex-BERJAYA member James Ongkili, and Liberal Democratic Party (LDP). Peninsula-based Democratic Action Party is also contesting in Sabah.

Results

Aftermath
PBS' Joseph Pairin Kitingan were sworn in as Chief Minister for the third time, on 18 July 1990. The state EXCO members were sworn in the following day.

On October that year, just before the 1990 Malaysian general election, Pairin announced PBS exit from BN and joining Gagasan Rakyat coalition with Democratic Action Party (DAP).

BERJAYA continued its decline from its heyday as a government in 1976-1985 with defeats in all constituencies, including in Sipitang where its leader Harris Salleh lost to PBS and garnering only 969 votes. It even fails to retain its only seat in Buang Sayang, also won by PBS candidate. This was the final election that BERJAYA contests.

The following year on 21 February, USNO were changed into a new entity, the Sabah chapter of Peninsula-based United Malays National Organization (UMNO) under BN. BERJAYA would merge into UMNO Sabah 2 months later, when it was announced by Harris on 11 April that he and all members of BERJAYA are joining UMNO Sabah.

In 1992 5 USNO assemblyman join PBS. The other 7 USNO member remained within UMNO Sabah.

References

Sabah state elections
Sabah